Canton Beach is a suburb located on the Central Coast of New South Wales, Australia, as part of the  local government area. It is next to Toukley which is a large residential and holiday town.

History
Late 1850s – Chinese fishermen worked the Tuggerah Lakes area, in particular, what is now known as Canton Beach. While not confirmed, it is believed this is where the name is derived from. It was a base for catching and curing fish that were then shipped to Queensland, the goldfields and back to China.
1856 – Edward Hargraves purchased Robert Henderson's holdings and built "Norahville". Wollombi Aboriginal Tribe members are known to have worked on the property. Some sources state that Hargraves "befriended" tribe members. Cattle were grazed as far as Buff Point and Elizabeth Bay.
1903 – Lighthouse built at Norah Head after many vessels were wrecked in the area.

References

Suburbs of the Central Coast (New South Wales)